Mathis Hamdi (born 18 October 2003) is a French professional footballer who plays as a left-back for Troyes.

Career
A youth product of his local club Saint-André, Hamdi joined the youth academy of Troyes at the age of 7. He worked his way up their youth categories, starting for their reserve sides in 2021. He made his professional debut with Troyes as a late substitute in a 2–0 Coupe de France loss to LOSC Lille on 8 January 2023.

References

External links
 
 Ligue 2 profile

2003 births
Living people
Sportspeople from Créteil
French footballers
French sportspeople of Algerian descent
ES Troyes AC players
Ligue 1 players
Championnat National 3 players
Association football fullbacks